Richard Alexander Waddell (born 4 February 1981 in Falkirk) is a Scottish football player and coach who is currently head coach of Scottish Lowland Football League team Caledonian Braves. His playing career as a defender or midfielder saw him play for Scottish clubs including Falkirk, Partick Thistle, Hamilton Academical, Airdrie United and Clyde, as well as spells in Singapore and the United States.

Playing Career

Waddell began his career with hometown team Falkirk, before joining Partick Thistle in 2003. He spent two years with the Jags, before having spells at Hamilton Academical and Forfar Athletic.

In 2006, he left Scotland, and joined Singaporean outfit Senkang Punggol. He returned to his home country in 2007, signing for Ayr United, before joining Airdrie United later in the same year.

He joined Clyde on 2 June 2008. He made his Clyde debut in a 2–0 victory against Alloa Athletic in the Scottish Challenge Cup in August 2008. Waddell's first goal for Clyde turned out to be the winning goal in a 3–2 victory over St Johnstone on 30 August 2008. Waddell's contract was terminated in June 2009, following Clyde's relegation and financial troubles. He went on to rejoin Airdrie United. After a season back at Airdrie, he joined Clyde again, where he stayed for a year, before being released in May 2011.

Managerial Career

Waddell was appointed manager of Lowland Football League team Caledonian Braves in 2015.

See also
2008–09 Clyde F.C. season

References

External links

1981 births
Living people
Footballers from Falkirk
Scottish footballers
Scottish expatriate footballers
Scottish expatriate sportspeople in the United States
Falkirk F.C. players
Partick Thistle F.C. players
Hamilton Academical F.C. players
Forfar Athletic F.C. players
Ayr United F.C. players
Airdrieonians F.C. players
Clyde F.C. players
Orange County SC players
Expatriate soccer players in the United States
Scottish Football League players
Scottish Premier League players
Singapore Premier League players
USL Championship players
Expatriate footballers in Singapore
Hougang United FC players
Rangers F.C. non-playing staff
Association football defenders
Association football midfielders
Caledonian Braves F.C. managers
Scottish football managers
Lowland Football League managers